This list of mountains of the Allgäu Alps tabulates those peaks and summits with names and spot heights that lie within the Allgäu Alps and that have a prominence of over . and an isolation of  or more (rounded).

Legend 
 No.: the order of the first fourteen peaks, because these are confirmed. The summits are arranged in order of height.
 Name: the name used in the literature.
 Elevation: the height of the summit point in metres. Depending on the location this will be reference to Normalhöhennull (Germany) or metres above the Adriatic (Austria).
 Group: the sub-range with the Allgäu Alps to which the mountain is assigned. The main summit of a sub-group is highlighted in colour.
 Location: the state and country in which the summit is located.
 Prominence: the prominence is the height difference between summits and the highest col to which one must at least descend in order to reach a higher summit. Given in metres together with the reference point (col).
 Isolation: the isolation describes the radius of the area over which the mountain rises. Given in kilometres with the reference point (rounded to 100 metres based on mathematical rules).
 Image: photograph of the respective mountain.

Summits 
By clicking the symbol at the head of a column the table may be sorted. All entries are taken from the given sources.

Notes

See also 
List of the highest mountains of Austria
List of the highest mountains of Germany
 Liste der Gipfel der Allgäuer Alpen (in German)

References

Footnotes

Literature 

 

Ernst Zettler, Heinz Groth: Alpine Club Guide – Allgäuer Alpen. 12th fully revised edition. Bergverlag Rudolf Rother, Munich, 1985, 

Maps
 Alpine Club map 2/1 Allgäuer-, Lechtaler Alpen – West (1:25.000).  (as at: 2004)
Alpine Club map 2/2 Allgäuer-, Lechtaler Alpen – Ost (1:25.000).  (as at: 2006)
Kompass walking, cycling and ski touring map: Sheet 3 Allgäuer Alpen, Kleinwalsertal (1:50,000).   (as at: January 2005)
Kompass walking, cycling and ski touring map: Sheet 03 Oberstdorf, Kleinwalsertal (1:25,000).   (as at: 2009)
Kompass walking, cycling and ski touring map: Sheet 04 Tannheimer Tal (1:35,000).  (as at: February 2007)

External links 
BayernViewer of the Bavarian Survey Department  – Topographic online maps of Bavaria
Austrian Map online – topographic online maps of Austria

Lists of mountains of the Alps